The 1992 Richmond Spiders football team was an American football team that represented the University of Richmond as a member of the Yankee Conference during the 1992 NCAA Division I-AA football season. In their fourth season under head coach Jim Marshall, Richmond compiled a 7–4 record, with a mark of 5–3 in conference play, finishing tied for third place in the Yankee.

Schedule

References

Richmond
Richmond Spiders football seasons
Richmond Spiders